The 2015 MTV Video Music Awards were held on August 30, 2015. The 32nd installment of the event was held at the Microsoft Theater in Los Angeles, California, and hosted by Miley Cyrus. Taylor Swift led the nominations with a total of ten, followed by Ed Sheeran, who had six, bringing his total number of mentions to 13. Swift's "Wildest Dreams" music video premiered during the pre-show. Cyrus also announced and released her studio album Miley Cyrus & Her Dead Petz, right after her performance at the end of the show. During his acceptance speech, Kanye West announced that he would be running in the 2020 United States presidential election. Taylor Swift won the most awards with four, including Video of the Year and Best Female Video. The VMA trophies were redesigned by Jeremy Scott.

This edition of the MTV VMA were followed by 9.8 million people in the United States through the various channels MTV for broadcast use. Due to a simulcast across ten Viacom networks, the 2015 ceremony's airing on the flagship MTV network alone had one of the lowest audience in the ceremony's 31-year history, with the following year's ceremony being the lowest of all time. According to Nielsen, it logged 5.03 million viewers only on MTV, 39% less than the previous year, while cumulative viewers drew 9.8 million with the nine other simulcasting networks. The lowest viewed edition since Nielson began tracking in 1994 was in 1996, with 5.07 million viewers. This broadcast, however, broke the "US Twitter record", being the most tweeted about non-sports program, with 21.4 million tweets delivered by 2.2 million people. It was also streamed live through the MTV app for authenticated users on mobile devices and television sets via iOS, Android and Chromecast. Through its website, viewers could also get to see un-aired audience shots and backstage coverage. mtvU aired a behind-the-scenes feed and MTV Hits went dark.

Performances

Presenters

Pre-show
Sway and Kelly Osbourne – hosts
Kelly Osbourne and Jeremy Scott – presented Best Rock Video
Carly Aquilino, Charlamagne Tha God, and Vic Mensa – presented Best Pop Video
Awkwafina and Nessa – presented Song of Summer

Main show
Ike Barinholtz and Andy Samberg – appeared in a pre-taped skit with host Miley Cyrus
Britney Spears – presented Best Male Video
Jared Leto – introduced The Weeknd
Rebel Wilson – presented Best Hip-Hop Video
Tyga, Juicy J, Mike Will Made It and Billy Ray Cyrus – appeared in a pre-taped skit with host Miley Cyrus
Big Sean and Nick Jonas – presented Best Female Video
Hailee Steinfeld – introduced Demi Lovato outside The Orpheum Theatre
Serayah and Jussie Smollett – presented Best Video with a Social Message
Ne-Yo and Kylie Jenner – introduced Tori Kelly
Taylor Swift – presented Video Vanguard Award
John Legend – introduced Pharrell Williams outside The Orpheum Theatre
Rita Ora and Emily Ratajkowski – presented Artist to Watch
Miguel and Gigi Hadid – introduced Twenty One Pilots and ASAP Rocky
Ice Cube and O'Shea Jackson, Jr. – presented Video of the Year
Happy Hippie Foundation members – introduced Miley Cyrus

Winners and nominees
The nominations were announced on July 21, 2015 via Apple Music's Beats 1. 
Nominees for the social media-driven category, Song of Summer, were announced on August 18, 2015.
Taylor Swift and Kendrick Lamar were tied with most nominations, 10. Ed Sheeran had 6, Nicki Minaj had 4.

Video of the Year
Taylor Swift (featuring Kendrick Lamar) – "Bad Blood"
 Beyoncé – "7/11"
 Kendrick Lamar – "Alright"
 Mark Ronson (featuring Bruno Mars) – "Uptown Funk"
 Ed Sheeran – "Thinking Out Loud"

Best Male Video
Mark Ronson (featuring Bruno Mars) – "Uptown Funk"
 Nick Jonas – "Chains"
 Kendrick Lamar - "Alright"
 Ed Sheeran – "Thinking Out Loud"
 The Weeknd – "Earned It"

Best Female Video
Taylor Swift – "Blank Space"
 Beyoncé – "7/11"
 Ellie Goulding – "Love Me Like You Do"
 Nicki Minaj – "Anaconda"
 Sia – "Elastic Heart"

Artist to Watch
Fetty Wap – "Trap Queen"
 James Bay – "Hold Back the River"
 George Ezra – "Budapest"
 FKA Twigs – "Pendulum"
 Vance Joy – "Riptide"

Best Pop Video
Taylor Swift – "Blank Space"
 Beyoncé – "7/11"
 Maroon 5 – "Sugar"
 Mark Ronson (featuring Bruno Mars) – "Uptown Funk"
 Ed Sheeran – "Thinking Out Loud"

Best Rock Video
Fall Out Boy – "Uma Thurman"
 Arctic Monkeys – "Why'd You Only Call Me When You're High?"
 Florence + the Machine – "Ship to Wreck"
 Hozier – "Take Me to Church"
 Walk the Moon – "Shut Up + Dance"

Best Hip-Hop Video
Nicki Minaj – "Anaconda"
 Big Sean (featuring E-40) – "I Don't Fuck with You"
 Fetty Wap – "Trap Queen"
 Kendrick Lamar – "Alright"
 Wiz Khalifa (featuring Charlie Puth) – "See You Again"

Best Collaboration
Taylor Swift (featuring Kendrick Lamar) – "Bad Blood"
 Ariana Grande and The Weeknd – " Love Me Harder"
 Jessie J, Ariana Grande and Nicki Minaj – "Bang Bang"
 Mark Ronson (featuring Bruno Mars) – "Uptown Funk"
 Wiz Khalifa (featuring Charlie Puth) – "See You  Again"

Best Direction
Kendrick Lamar – "Alright" (Directors: Colin Tilley and the Little Homies)
 Childish Gambino – "Sober" (Director: Hiro Murai)
 Hozier – "Take Me to Church" (Directors: Brendan Canty and Conal Thomson)
 Mark Ronson (featuring Bruno Mars) – "Uptown Funk" (Directors: Bruno Mars and Cameron Duddy)
 Taylor Swift (featuring Kendrick Lamar) – "Bad Blood" (Director: Joseph Kahn)

Best Choreography
OK Go – "I Won't Let You Down" (Choreographer: OK Go, air:man and Mori Harano)
 Beyoncé – "7/11" (Choreographers: Beyoncé, Chris Grant and Gabriel Valenciano)
 Chet Faker – "Gold" (Choreographer: Ryan Heffington)
 Flying Lotus (featuring Kendrick Lamar) – "Never Catch Me" (Choreographers: Keone Madrid and Mari Madrid)
 Ed Sheeran – "Don't" (Choreographers: Nappytabs)

Best Visual Effects
Skrillex and Diplo (featuring Justin Bieber) – "Where Are Ü Now" (Visual Effects: Brewer, GloriaFX, Tomash Kuzmytskyi and Max Chyzhevskyy)
 Childish Gambino – "Telegraph Ave." (Visual Effects: GloriaFX)
 FKA Twigs – "Two Weeks" (Visual Effects: GloriaFX, Tomash Kuzmytskyi and Max Chyzhevskyy)
 Taylor Swift (featuring Kendrick Lamar) – "Bad Blood" (Visual Effects: Ingenuity Studios)
 Tyler, The Creator – "Fucking Young/Death Camp" (Visual Effects: GloriaFX)

Best Art Direction
Snoop Dogg – "So Many Pros" (Art Director: Jason Fijal)
 The Chemical Brothers – "Go" (Art Director: Michel Gondry)
 Skrillex and Diplo (featuring Justin Bieber) – "Where Are Ü Now" (Art Director: Brewer)
 Taylor Swift (featuring Kendrick Lamar) – "Bad Blood" (Art Director: Charles Infante)
 Jack White – "Would You Fight for My Love?" (Art Director: Jeff Peterson)

Best Editing
Beyoncé – "7/11" (Editors: Beyoncé, Ed Burke and Jonathan Wing)
 ASAP Rocky – "L$D" (Editor: Dexter Navy)
 Ed Sheeran – "Don't" (Editor: Jacquelyn London)
 Skrillex and Diplo (featuring Justin Bieber) – "Where Are Ü Now" (Editor: Brewer)
 Taylor Swift (featuring Kendrick Lamar) – "Bad Blood" (Editor: Chancler Haynes at Cosmo Street)

Best Cinematography
Flying Lotus (featuring Kendrick Lamar) – "Never Catch Me" (Director of Photography: Larkin Seiple)
 Alt-J – "Left Hand Free" (Director of Photography: Mike Simpson)
 FKA Twigs – "Two Weeks" (Director of Photography: Justin Brown)
 Ed Sheeran – "Thinking Out Loud" (Director of Photography: Daniel Pearl)
 Taylor Swift (featuring Kendrick Lamar) – "Bad Blood" (Director of Photography: Christopher Probst)

Best Video with a Social Message
Big Sean (featuring Kanye West and John Legend) – "One Man Can Change the World"
 Colbie Caillat – "Try"
 Jennifer Hudson – "I Still Love You"
 Rihanna – "American Oxygen" 
 Wale – "The White Shoes"

Song of Summer

5 Seconds of Summer – "She's Kinda Hot"
 Fetty Wap – "My Way"
 Fifth Harmony  – "Worth It"
 Selena Gomez (featuring ASAP Rocky) – "Good for You" 
 David Guetta (featuring Nicki Minaj) – "Hey Mama"
 Demi Lovato – "Cool for the Summer"
 Major Lazer – "Lean On"
 OMI – "Cheerleader"
 Silentó – "Watch Me (Whip/Nae Nae)"
 Skrillex and Diplo (featuring Justin Bieber) – "Where Are U Now"
 Taylor Swift – "Bad Blood"
 The Weeknd – "Can't Feel My Face"

Michael Jackson Video Vanguard Award

Kanye West

See also
2015 MTV Europe Music Awards

Notes

References

External links 
 

MTV Video Music Awards
MTV Video Music Awards
MTV Video Music Awards ceremonies
2015 in Los Angeles
MTV Video Music